Georgia Championship Wrestling was an American professional wrestling promotion based in Atlanta, Georgia. The promotion was affiliated with what had been the world's top sanctioning body of championship titles for decades before, the National Wrestling Alliance (NWA), and ran live wrestling shows throughout its geographic "territory" of Georgia. The company was also known for its self-titled TV program, which aired in the 1970s and 1980s on Atlanta-based superstation WTBS.

History
Georgia Championship Wrestling was formed in Atlanta in 1944 by promoter Paul Jones (retired wrestler Andrew Lutzi, not Paul Frederik who later was given the name) as ABC Booking. ABC held its matches at Atlanta's Municipal Auditorium on Friday evenings. Jones operated ABC for thirty years until his retirement in 1974, though from about 1970 until 1972 he was assisted by his booker Ray Gunkel. Jones was so infirmed by this time (he died in 1988) that Gunkel effectively ran the promotion.

On December 25, 1971, Georgia Championship Wrestling made its television debut with a special Christmas program. Beginning in late January 1972 the promotion's regular series, Big Time Wrestling, began airing on Saturday afternoons on WQXI-TV in Atlanta; the show was recorded for later broadcast over WJBF in Augusta and WTOC-TV in Savannah, stations located in two of GCW's major cities. Big Time Wrestling was hosted by Ed Capral, and featured ring announcer Charlie Harben and referee Leo Garibaldi, and included interviews with wrestlers pertaining to their upcoming matches.

The promotion underwent some big changes in 1972. Firstly, it started promoting matches at the then-brand-new Omni Coliseum. Secondly, it switched its television outlet from its original home, then-ABC-affiliated WQXI-TV (now WXIA-TV) to UHF independent station WTCG, then owned by Ted Turner. WTCG would become a satellite-distributed superstation in 1976, change its call letters to WTBS in 1979, and became WPCH-TV after its over-the-air Atlanta-area signal was spun off from the national TBS cable channel in 2007.

Battle of Atlanta
The new television deal would be one of Gunkel's last decisions. Ray Gunkel died of a heart attack later that year after a match versus Ox Baker in Savannah, Georgia. The death set off some internal problems, with Ray's widow Ann, who had worked closely with Ray and expected to get her share of the promotion being shut out in favor of Bill Watts, with the promotion being renamed "Mid-South Sports." Ann Gunkel decided to start her own promotion outside of the National Wrestling Alliance, which she named the "All-South Wrestling Alliance."

Mid-South Sports's longterm prospects were not good at that point, most of their wrestlers had gone with Ann, and Ann's promotion had gotten Mid-South's television time slot, though both promotions aired on WTCG. (Ted Turner and Ann Gunkel had both attended Brown University and were rumored to be romantically involved.) After two years of strife, a trouble-shooter was called in: Jim Barnett, who had owned promotions in Indiana, Michigan, Ohio, Colorado and Australia. (The Australian promotion was called World Championship Wrestling.) At this point, Ann's promotion went downhill, being locked out of arena dates, with wrestlers defecting to Mid-South, and finally Ann Gunkel's All-South Wrestling Alliance folded in 1974.

Superstation

When WTCG became distributed via satellite in 1976, the renamed Georgia Championship Wrestling became the first television program produced by an NWA-affiliated promotion to be broadcast nationally. This program was hosted by Gordon Solie and was recorded in the studios of WTCG in Midtown Atlanta. Shows were taped before a small (yet enthusiastic), live in-studio audience, as were most professional wrestling TV shows of that era. The show featured wrestling matches, plus melodramatic monologues and inter-character confrontations—similar to the programming offered by other territories, including the Northeast-based World Wrestling Federation (WWF, now WWE). GCW's main show, which aired on Saturday evenings, was complemented with a Sunday evening edition.

Many of the NWA's regional promoters were unhappy, but Barnett claimed since he was only using Georgia-based wrestlers, that there was no harm. Whether or not Barnett was in fact taking the promotion national is a matter of dispute. Some wrestlers, such as Roddy Piper, say that he was in fact doing so, but was prevented by fears of crossing organized crime figures involved with the sport. Throughout the 1970s, Georgia Championship Wrestling was one of the main shows that kept the Superstation alive.

In 1982, Georgia Championship Wrestling changed its main programming name to World Championship Wrestling. GCW also expanded its reach into Ohio and Michigan; wrestling returned to Dayton, Ohio in January 1983 after a lay-off of no wrestling in Dayton for five years.

A power struggle in late 1983 forced Barnett to sell most of his shares in GCW to a conglomerate consisting of wrestlers and brothers Jack Brisco and Jerry Brisco; Paul Jones; and Al Rogowski, a match booker, who also wrestled as "Ole Anderson." This move set the stage for an important move in wrestling history, involving another regional promoter: Vince McMahon.

Black Saturday

In 1984, the Brisco brothers sold their stock in GCW to McMahon for $900,000. In return McMahon received GCW's television time slots on WTBS, which McMahon then claimed for his WWF, which was in the midst of expanding into a national promotion. McMahon also guaranteed jobs with the WWF for the Briscos; Jerry Brisco remained with WWF/WWE before suffering three strokes in 2009. After working out a few prior commitments, Georgia Championship Wrestling ceased to exist.

GCW announcer Freddie Miller was the only member of the original GCW on-air cast who did not quit in protest or just get replaced by the new owner. McMahon had underestimated two major factors, however. The first was the differences in tastes between fanbases of different geographical regions. The WWF's style of wrestling sharply differed from that of GCW, with the WWF featuring cartoonish characters and storylines and squash matches and GCW featuring more athletic competition. Secondly, Southerners resented the symbolism of a "Yankee" company coming down from the North and "taking over" their wrestling.

In addition, WWF World Championship Wrestling was mainly used as a re-cap show, featuring matches which had previously aired on the WWF's main programming venues such as WWF Championship Wrestling and WWF All-Star Wrestling. This angered WTBS owner Ted Turner, who believed McMahon reneged on a promise to have live matches originating from Turner Broadcasting System's Atlanta studios. Finally, on March 2, 1985, the WWF changed the name of their program to WWF Georgia Championship Wrestling and began airing in-studio squash matches co-hosted by ring announcer Miller and play-by-play commentator Gorilla Monsoon. Along with the squash matches, Miller did interviews with many of the WWF stars, mainly to promote the upcoming, inaugural WrestleMania I.

The WWF version of the show received somewhat lower Nielsen ratings than its NWA-associated forerunner. As a result, on March 30, 1985, McMahon sold the Saturday night time slot (but not the Georgia Championship Wrestling promotion) to Jim Crockett, Jr., a Charlotte-based promoter who ran NWA-branded shows in the Mid-Atlantic states. Jim Crockett Promotions took over production of the television show using the same set. In time, the show was renamed WCW Saturday Night, reflecting an overhauled look and a new home studio-arena at the CNN Center. In 2001, the WWF gained the rights to Crockett's library of GCW/WCW/NWA matches and shows, augmenting the WWE Tape Library through its purchase of assets and trademarks belonging to the now-defunct WCW (now a legal entity called WCW, Inc.).

According to Ric Flair in his autobiography To Be the Man, The Road Warriors were offered $5,000 to injure the Brisco brothers during a tag team match by an unnamed, disgruntled source. Instead of injuring them, they promptly informed the Briscos and told them not to worry because, "We're not those kinds of business people."

Championship Wrestling from Georgia
After Black Saturday, Ole Anderson tried to carry on in the territory, promoting Championship Wrestling from Georgia (CWG), which briefly aired out of Atlanta. In April 1985, shows began being co-promoted with Jim Crockett Promotions. On April 27's main event, Arn Anderson wrestled Thunderbolt Patterson to a no contest in the Columbus Municipal Auditorium, then CWG disappeared. The National titles, originally created in 1980 in Georgia, were carried on by Crockett until 1986, when they were either abandoned or unified with equivalent titles.

1990s-present
Promoter and businessman, Grady Odum acquired the rights to Georgia Championship Wrestling in the early 1990s. Promoting events through the mid-1990s across central Georgia, Odum was successful in keeping the brand alive. In 2011 he began promoting a string of reunion shows in Macon, Cordele, Athens and Augusta which saw many legends of GCW along with upcoming local talents. On June 23, 2018, a tribute event to the late Bill Dromo was held in Carrollton, Georgia.   Following the Dromo event, GCW again lay dormant until October 3, 2020, when Odum granted local wrestlers and businessmen Tim Rice and Chris Nelms the rights to begin promoting their events under the Georgia Championship Wrestling banner.

Alumni

Marcus Alexander Bagwell
Abdullah the Butcher
Ole Anderson
Gene Anderson
Lars Anderson
Bob Armstrong
Brad Armstrong
The Assassin
Assassin #2
Tony Atlas
Ron Bass
B. Brian Blair
Jack Brisco
Jerry Brisco
Bruiser Brody
Ted DiBiase
Hacksaw Jim Duggan
Bobby Duncum
Wayne Ferris
"Nature Boy" Ric Flair
Robert Fuller
Ron Fuller
Dory Funk Jr.
Terry Funk
Jimmy Garvin
Ronnie Garvin
Dick Garza (Mighty Igor)
Terry Gibbs
Gorgeous George Jr.
Stan Hansen
Gino Hernandez
Hulk Hogan
Tim Horner
Austin Idol
The Iron Sheik
Freight Train Jones
Paul Jones
Junkyard Dog
Steve Keirn
Killer Karl Kox
Ivan Koloff
Ernie "Big Cat" Ladd
Mark Lewin
Rick Martel
The Masked Superstar
Hiro Matsuda
Wahoo McDaniel
Mr. Fuji
Mr. Wrestling
Mr. Wrestling II
Mongolian Stomper
Don Muraco
Jerry Oates
Steve Olsonoski
Paul Orndorff
Ken Patera 
Thunderbolt Patterson
Rowdy Roddy Piper
Tom Prichard
Ivan Putski
Harley Race
Baron Von Raschke
Butch Reed
Tommy Rich
Jake Roberts
Dusty Rhodes
David Sammartino
Tito Santana
Brett Sawyer
Buzz Sawyer
Otis Sistrunk
Dick Slater
Jimmy Snuka
Ricky Steamboat
George Steele
Ray Stevens
Big John Studd
Kevin Sullivan
Professor Toru Tanaka
Terry Taylor
Les Thornton
Nikolai Volkoff
George Wells
Larry Zbyszko

Tag teams and stables
 The Fabulous Freebirds
 The Road Warriors
 The Brisco Brothers: Jerry Brisco and Jack Brisco

Championships

State
NWA Georgia Heavyweight Championship
NWA Georgia Junior Heavyweight Championship
NWA Georgia Television Championship
NWA Georgia Tag Team Championship

City (outside Atlanta)

NWA Columbus Heavyweight Championship

The NWA Columbus Heavyweight Championship was a professional wrestling regional championship in Georgia Championship Wrestling (GCW). It was a secondary title, complementing the NWA Columbus Tag Team Championship, and defended almost exclusively at the Columbus Municipal Auditorium throughout the 1970s.

The Columbus titles were one of two sets of GCW's city-wide championships, along with the NWA Macon Heavyweight Championship and NWA Macon Tag Team Championship, and one of a select few city championships recognized by the National Wrestling Alliance. The final champion was Angelo Mosca and the title was eventually abandoned after 1979.

There have been a total of 11 recognized champions who have had a combined 18 official reigns, with "Bullet" Bob Armstrong holding the most at four. At 131 days, Armstrong's second reign was the longest in the title's history. The shortest reigning champion was Hiro Matsuda, whose first and only reign lasted 21 days.

List of top combined reigns

NWA Columbus Tag Team Championship

The NWA Columbus Tag Team Championship was a professional wrestling tag team championship in Georgia Championship Wrestling (GCW). A secondary title complementing the NWA Columbus Heavyweight Championship, it was one of many state tag team championships recognized by the National Wrestling Alliance.

Some reigns were held by champions using a ring name, while others used their real name. There have been a total of 13 recognized individual champions and 8 recognized teams, who have had a combined 10 official reigns. The earliest recorded champions were The Mighty Yankees (Mighty Yankee #1 and Mighty Yankee #2), and the last-known champions were Robert Fuller and Bob Armstrong. The following is a chronological list of teams that have been Columbus Tag Team Champions by ring name.

NWA Macon Heavyweight Championship
NWA Macon Tag Team Championship

National
NWA National Heavyweight Championship
NWA National Tag Team Championship
NWA National Television Championship

Southern (Georgia versions)
NWA Southern Heavyweight Championship
NWA Southern Tag Team Championship
NWA Southern Women's Championship

International/world (Georgia versions)
NWA International Tag Team Championship
NWA World Junior Heavyweight Championship
NWA World Tag Team Championship

See also
List of National Wrestling Alliance territories
List of independent wrestling promotions in the United States

Notes

References
General

Specific

External links
Georgia Wrestling History
Georgia Championship Wrestling Title History
End Of An Era On TBS

1972 American television series debuts
1984 American television series endings
American professional wrestling television series
American companies disestablished in 1984
Entertainment companies established in 1944
Independent professional wrestling promotions based in Georgia (U.S. state)
Jim Crockett Promotions
National Wrestling Alliance members
TBS (American TV channel) original programming
Television shows filmed in Atlanta
American companies established in 1944
1944 establishments in Georgia (U.S. state)
WWE